Jesus Christ Superstar (1996 London Cast) is a soundtrack album released in 1996. Jesus Christ Superstar is a rock opera created by Tim Rice and Andrew Lloyd Webber in 1970. This is the 1996 revival version supervised by Lloyd Webber himself.

This album features Steve Balsamo (as Jesus), Zubin Varla (as Judas) and Joanna Ampil (as Mary Magdalene). Rocker Alice Cooper was brought in to sing King Herod's Song, which differs from the actual 1996 cast.

Singers

Steve Balsamo as Jesus
Zubin Varla as Judas
Joanna Ampil as Mary Magdalene
David Burt - Pilate
Pete Gallagher - Caiaphas
Martin Callaghan - Annas
Glenn Carter - Simon
Alice Cooper as King Herod
Jonathan Hart - Peter

See also
 Jesus Christ Superstar

References

2000 albums
Cast recordings
Theatre soundtracks
Jesus Christ Superstar